Nariman Abbasgulu oghlu Azimov (June 1, 1936 — November 19, 2016) was an Azerbaijani conductor, composer, People's Artiste of Azerbaijan.

Biography 
Nariman Azimov was born on June 1, 1936, in Ganja. In 1955 he entered the Faculty of Conducting of the Hajibeyov Azerbaijan State Conservatoire. He worked as a choirmaster in the Choir of AzTR, and since 1974 has been the art director and chief conductor of the Said Rustamov Azerbaijan State Orchestra of Folk Instruments. AzTV CJSC worked as a sound director. In 2003, he became a professor.

Nariman Azimov died on November 19, 2016, in Baku.

Awards 
 People's Artiste of Azerbaijan — May 4, 1991
 Honored Artist of the Azerbaijan SSR — June 29, 1977
 Shohrat Order — November 7, 2016
 Honorary Decree of the Supreme Soviet of the Azerbaijan SSR — December 9, 1982

References 

Baku Academy of Music alumni
Recipients of the Shohrat Order
1936 births
2016 deaths